

Pla may refer to:

People
 Cecilio Plá (1860–1934), Spanish painter
 Conrad Pla (born 1966), Canadian kickboxer and actor
 Jim Pla (born 1992), French racing driver
 Joan Baptista Pla (ca. 1720–1773), Spanish composer and oboist
 Josefina Pla (1903–1999), Spanish writer
 Josep Pla (composer) (ca. 1728–1762)
 Josep Pla (1897–1981), Spanish journalist
 Manuel Pla (ca. 1725–1766), Spanish composer
 Marylin Pla (born 1984), French skater
 Olivier Pla (born 1981), French racing driver
 Rodrigo Plá (born 1968), Mexican screenwriter

Places
 El Pla del Penedès, a municipality in the comarca of Alt Penedès, Spain
 El Pla de Santa Maria, a municipality in the comarca of the Alt Camp, Spain
 Le Pla, a commune in southwestern France
 Pla d'Urgell, a comarca in Catalonia, Spain

See also
 PLA